Dobje is a small village in the Poljane Sora Valley in the Municipality of Gorenja Vas–Poljane in the Upper Carniola region of Slovenia.

Notable people
Notable people that were born or lived in Dobje include:
 Ivan Franke (1841–1927), painter

References

External links 

Dobje on Geopedia

Populated places in the Municipality of Gorenja vas-Poljane